This is a timeline of events leading up to, culminating in, and resulting from the English Civil Wars.

Events prior to the English Civil War

1626 – Parliament dismisses George Villiers, 1st Duke of Buckingham from command of English forces in Europe; Charles I, furious, dismisses Parliament.
1628 – Charles recalls Parliament; Parliament draws up Petition of Right which Charles reluctantly accepts. John Felton murders George Villiers in Portsmouth.
1629 – Charles dismisses Parliament and does not call it again until 1640, thus commencing the Personal Rule
1633 – William Laud appointed Archbishop of Canterbury.
1637 – Charles attempts to impose Anglican services on the Presbyterian Church of Scotland, Jenny Geddes reacts starting a tumult which leads to the National Covenant.
1639–1640 – Bishops' Wars start in Scotland.

1640
13 April, first meeting of the Short Parliament
5 May, Charles dissolves the Short Parliament
26 October, Charles forced to sign the Treaty of Ripon.
3 November, first meeting of the Long Parliament.
11 December, the Root and Branch Petition submitted to the Long Parliament

1641
July, the Long Parliament passes "An Act for the Regulating the Privie Councell and for taking away the Court commonly called the Star Chamber"
July, Charles returns to Scotland and accedes to all Covenanter demands
August, the Root and Branch Bill rejected by the Long Parliament
October, outbreak of the Irish Rebellion of 1641
1 December – The Grand Remonstrance is presented to the King
December – The Long Parliament passes the Bishops Exclusion Act

Events of 1642
4 January, Charles unsuccessfully attempts to personally arrest the Five Members (John Pym, John Hampden, Denzil Holles, Sir Arthur Haselrig, and William Strode) on the floor of the House of Commons
January, on the orders of the Long Parliament, Sir John Hotham, 1st Baronet seizes the arsenal at Kingston upon Hull
5 February, the bishops of the Church of England are excluded from the House of Lords by the Bishops Exclusion Act
23 February – Henrietta Maria goes to the Netherlands with Princess Mary and the crown jewels
5 March, the Long Parliament passes the Militia Ordinance
15 March, the Long Parliament proclaims that "the People are bound by the Ordinance for the Militia, though it has not received the Royal Assent"
April, Sir John Hotham, 1st Baronet refuses the king entrance to Kingston upon Hull
May – The Irish rebellion ends 
2 June – The Nineteen Propositions rejected
3 June, The great meeting on Heworth Moor outside York, summoned by Charles to garner support for his cause.
July, Charles I of England unsuccessfully besieged Hull
July, Parliament appoints the Committee of Safety
 29 September The Treaty of Neutrality (Yorkshire) signed by Lord Fairfax for Parliament and Henry Bellasis for the Royalists
 23 October Battle of Edgehill
 1 December Battle of Piercebridge
 7 December Battle of Tadcaster
 18 December First Sieges of Bradford (Battle of the Steeple)

The First English Civil War

Events of 1643
 19 January, Battle of Braddock Down
 23 January, Battle of Leeds
 28 January, the Long Parliament sends commissioners to negotiate the Treaty of Oxford (unsuccessful)
 19 March, Battle of Hopton Heath 
 30 March, Battle of Seacroft Moor
 3 April, Battle of Camp Hill — a Royalist victory
 8–21 April, Siege of Lichfield — a Royalist capture
 25 April, Battle of Sourton Down — Parliamentarian victory
 16 May, Battle of Stratton — Royalist victory
 21 May, Thomas Fairfax launches an attack on the Royalist garrison at Wakefield to take prisoners in exchange for the men lost at Seacroft Moor
 29–31 May, Siege of Worcester — Parliamentarians failed to capture
 16 June, the Long Parliament passes the Licensing Order
 18 June, Battle of Chalgrove Field — John Hampden was mortally wounded during the Battle and died on Saturday evening of 24 June 1643.
 30 June, Battle of Adwalton Moor 
 1 July, first meeting of the Westminster Assembly
 2 July Second Sieges of Bradford
 4 July, Battle of Burton Bridge
 5 July, Battle of Lansdowne (or Lansdown) fought near Bath.
 13 July, Battle of Roundway Down fought near Devizes
 20 July, Battle of Gainsborough
 26 July, Storming of Bristol
 17 August, the Church of Scotland ratifies the Solemn League and Covenant
 2 September, Beginning of Siege of Hull (1643)
 18 September, Battle of Aldbourne Chase 
 20 September, First Battle of Newbury 
 25 September, the Long Parliament and the Westminster Assembly ratify the Solemn League and Covenant.  Under the terms of the deal with Scotland, the Committee of Safety is superseded by the Committee of Both Kingdoms
 11 October, Battle of Winceby

Events of 1644
The Scots marched South and joined Parliament's army threatening York.
 26 January, Battle of Nantwich
 3 February, Siege of Newcastle, formal request to surrender to the Scots.
 29 March, Battle of Cheriton 
 28 May, Storming of Bolton and the Bolton Massacre
 29 June, Battle of Cropredy Bridge 
 2 July, Battle of Marston Moor
 13 September, Second Battle of Aberdeen
 19 October, Siege of Newcastle ends with the storming of the city by Scottish soldiers
 24 October, the Long Parliament passes the Ordinance of no quarter to the Irish
 27 October, Second Battle of Newbury
 23 November, first publication of Areopagitica by John Milton
 4 November, the Long Parliament sends the Propositions of Uxbridge to the king at Oxford

Events of 1645

 6 January, the Committee of Both Kingdoms orders the creation of the New Model Army
 28 January, the Long Parliament appoints commissioners to meet with the king's commissioners at Uxbridge
 22 February, negotiations over the Treaty of Uxbridge end unsuccessfully
 February–July, Great Siege of Scarborough Castle
 23 April, the Long Parliament passes the Self-denying Ordinance
 9 May, Battle of Auldearn 
 30 May, Siege and sacking of Leicester
 14 June, Battle of Naseby
 2 July, Battle of Alford 
 10 July, Battle of Langport
 15 August, Battle of Kilsyth 
 13 September, Battle of Philiphaugh 
 24 September, Battle of Rowton Heath 
 Surrender of Leicester
 October fear of Royalist attack in south Lincolnshire
 Charles went to Welbeck, Nottinghamshire
 17 December Siege of Hereford ended with the surrender of Royalist garrison.

Events of 1646
 18 January, Siege of Dartmouth ended with the surrender of Royalist garrison.
 3 February, Siege of Chester ended with the surrender of Royalist garrison after a 136-day siege.
 16 February, Battle of Torrington victory for the New Model Army
 10 March, Ralph Hopton surrenders the Royalist army at Tresillian bridge in Cornwall.
 21 March, Battle of Stow-on-the-Wold the last pitched battle of the First Civil War is a victory for the New Model Army
 13 April, Siege of Exeter ended with the surrender of Royalist garrison.
 5 May, Charles surrendered to a Scottish army at Southwell, Nottinghamshire
 6 May, Newark fell to the Parliamentarians
 24 June, Siege of Oxford ended with the surrender of Royalist garrison.
 22 July, Siege of Worcester ended with the surrender of Royalist garrison.
 27 July, after a 65-day siege, Wallingford Castle, the last English royalist stronghold,  surrenders to Sir Thomas Fairfax.
 19 August, Royalist garrison of Raglan Castle surrendered (Wales)
 9 October, the Long Parliament passes the Ordinance for the abolishing of Archbishops and Bishops in England and Wales and for settling their lands and possessions upon Trustees for the use of the Commonwealth

Events of 1647
 13 March, Harlech Castle the last Royalist stronghold in Wales surrendered to the Parliamentary forces.
 29 May, General Council of the Army drew-up the Solemn Engagement
 3 June, Cornet George Joyce (a junior officer in Fairfax's horse) with a troop of New Model Army cavalry seizes the King from his Parliamentary guards at Holdenby House and place him in protective custody of the New Model Army 
 4–5 June, at a rendezvoused on Kentford Heath near Newmarket the officers and men of the New Model Army gave their assent to the Solemn Engagement
 8 June, General Fairfax sent the Solemn Engagement to Parliament along with a letter explaining that the King was now in the custody of the Army negotiations would be conducted through New Model Army representatives
 1 August, General Council of the Army offers the Heads of Proposals
 31 August, Montrose escaped from the Highlands
 October, "An Agreement of the People for a firm and present peace upon grounds of common right", presented to the Army Council
 28 October, Beginning of the Putney Debates. Ended 11 November.
 26 December, a faction of Scottish Covenanters sign The Engagement with Charles I

The Second English Civil War

Events of 1648
 8 May, Battle of St. Fagans
 16 May(?) – 11 July Siege of Pembroke
 1 June, Battle of Maidstone
 13 June – 28 August, Siege of Colchester
 17 August – 19 August, Battle of Preston
 19 August, Battle of Winwick
 28 August, On the evening of the surrender of Colchester, Royalists Sir Charles Lucas and Sir George Lisle were shot
 15 September, Treaty of Newport
 November, leaders in the army draft the Remonstrance of the Army
 6 December, Pride's Purge, when troops under Colonel Thomas Pride removed opponents of Oliver Cromwell from Parliament by force of arms resulting in Rump Parliament

Events of 1649
15 January, "An Agreement of the People of England, and the places therewith incorporated, for a secure and present peace, upon grounds of common right, freedom and safety" presented to the Rump Parliament
20 January, The trial of Charles I of England by the High Court of Justice begins
27 January, The death warrant of Charles I of England is signed
30 January, Charles I of England executed by beheading – the Rump Parliament passes Act prohibiting the proclaiming any person to be King of England or Ireland, or the Dominions thereof
5 February, The eldest son of Charles I, Charles, Prince of Wales, was proclaimed "king of Great Britain, France and Ireland" by the Scottish Parliament at the Mercat Cross, Edinburgh.
7 February, The Rump Parliament votes to abolish the English monarchy
 9 February, publication of Eikon Basilike, allegedly by Charles I of England
 14 February, the Rump Parliament creates the English Council of State
 February, Charles II proclaimed king of Great Britain, France and Ireland by Hugh, Viscount Montgomery and other Irish Royalists at Newtownards in Ulster.
9 March, Engager Duke of Hamilton, Royalist Earl of Holland, and Royalist Lord Capel were beheaded at Westminster 
17 March, an Act abolishing the kingship is formally passed by the Rump Parliament.
24 March, The capitulation of Pontefract Castle which, even after the death of Charles I, remained loyal to Charles II
1 May, "AN AGREEMENT OF THE Free People of England. Tendered as a Peace-Offering to this distressed Nation" extended version from the Leveller leaders, "Lieutenant Colonel John Lilburne, Master William Walwyn, Master Thomas Prince (Leveller), and Master Richard Overton, Prisoners in the Tower of London, May the 1. 1649."
October, first publication of Eikonoklastes by John Milton, a rebuttal of Eikon Basilike

English invasion of Scotland

Events of 1650
 1 May, Treaty of Breda signed between Charles II and the Scottish Covenanters
  23 June, Charles II   signs the Solemn League and Covenant
 3 September, Battle of Dunbar, Scotland
 1 December, Battle of Hieton, Scotland (skirmish)

Events of 1651
 1 January, Charles II crowned King of Scots at Scone
 20 July, Battle of Inverkeithing
 25 August, Battle of Wigan Lane (skirmish)
 28 August, Battle of Upton (the start of the western encirclement of Worcester)
 3 September, Battle of Worcester
 3 September, the start of the escape of Charles II
 6 September, Charles II spends the day hiding in the Royal Oak in the woodlands surrounding Boscobel House
 16 October, Charles II landed in Normandy, France, after successfully fleeing England

Events after the English Civil War
deathcount: 
royalists: 50,000.
parliamentarians:  34,000
 1650–1660, English Interregnum
 1649–1653, The first period of the Commonwealth of England 
 20 April 1653, The Rump Parliament disbanded by Oliver Cromwell
 1653–1658, The Protectorate under Oliver Cromwell
 25 March 1655, Battle of the Severn was fought in the Province of Maryland and was won by a Puritan force fighting under a Commonwealth flag who defeated a Royalist force fighting for Lord Baltimore
 13 April 1657, Oliver Cromwell declines the crown of England
 3 September 1658, Death of Oliver Cromwell
 1658–1659, The Protectorate under Richard Cromwell
 7 May 1659, Rump Parliament restored by Richard Cromwell
 25 May 1659, Richard Cromwell delivered a formal letter resigning the position of Lord Protector
 13 October 1659, Rump Parliament disbanded again
 1659–1660, The second period of the Commonwealth of England 
 1660, English Restoration and the return of King Charles II of England
30 January 1660, Charles II proclaimed King of England
March 1660, Convention Parliament elected
4 April 1660, Charles II issued the Declaration of Breda, which made known the conditions of his acceptance of the crown of England
25 April 1660, Convention Parliament assembled for the first time 
29 May 1660, Charles II arrives in London and the English monarchy is restored
July 1660, Richard Cromwell left England for the Kingdom of France where he went by a variety of pseudonyms, including "John Clarke"
29 December 1660, Convention Parliament disbanded by Charles II
23 April 1661, coronation of Charles II at Westminster Abbey
 1660–1662, The trials and executions of the regicides of Charles I
 30 January 1661, On the 12th anniversary of the beheading of Charles I, the exhumed remains of Oliver Cromwell were posthumously executed (Cromwell's severed head was displayed on a pole outside Westminster Hall until 1685)

See also
 Chronology of the Wars of the Three Kingdoms
 Cornwall in the English Civil War
 Shropshire in the English Civil War
 Timeline of the Wars of the Three Kingdoms (1639–1651)
 Worcestershire in the English Civil War

Notes

Some of the information on this page could be different or similar to other websites.

References

External links
A national Civil War timeline
Events in and around Lincolnshire
BattleOfEdgehill.org

British history timelines
 Timeline of
Timelines of military conflicts